Kolbu is a former municipality in the old Oppland county, Norway. The  municipality existed from 1908 until its dissolution in 1964. The area is now part of Østre Toten Municipality in the traditional district of Toten. The administrative centre was the village of Kolbu.

History
The municipality of Kolbu was established on 1 January 1908 when the old Vestre Toten Municipality was divided in three. The southwestern part (population: 1,173) became Eina Municipality, the southeastern part (population: 2,412) became Kolbu Municipality, and the northern part (population: 4,027) continued as Vestre Toten Municipality. During the 1960s, there were many municipal mergers across Norway due to the work of the Schei Committee. On 1 January 1964, Kolbu Municipality (population: 2,906) was merged with Østre Toten Municipality (population: 10,661) to form a new, larger Østre Toten Municipality.

Name
The municipality was named after the old Kolbu farm since this is where the church was located. The first element of the name Kol- means "coal" and the last element bú means "house" or "dwelling".

Government
All municipalities in Norway, including Kolbu, are responsible for primary education (through 10th grade), outpatient health services, senior citizen services, unemployment and other social services, zoning, economic development, and municipal roads. The municipality was governed by a municipal council of elected representatives, which in turn elected a mayor.

Municipal council
The municipal council  of Kolbu was made up of 17 representatives that were elected to four year terms.  The party breakdown of the final municipal council was as follows:

Mayor
The mayors of Kolbu have been:

1908-1916: Hans Sethne (LL)
1917-1919: Olaf Holthe(LL)
1920-1922: Johannes Hoel (LL)
1923-1925: Olaf Holthe (LL)
1926-1928: Johannes Hoel (Bp)
1929-1934: Paul J. Narum (Bp)
1935-1936: Erik Gaardløs (RF)
1937-1937: Claus Smedsrud (Ap)
1937-1937: Paul J. Narum (Bp)
1938-1944: Hans D. Nøkleby (Bp)
1945-1945: Per P. Røise 
1946-1947: Paul J. Narum (Bp)
1948-1951: Bernt Dysthe (Bp)
1952-1956: Karl Lund (Ap)
1957-1960: Mathias Molstad (Sp)
1961-1963: Kristian O. Narum (Sp)

See also
List of former municipalities of Norway

References

Østre Toten
Vestre Toten
Former municipalities of Norway
1908 establishments in Norway
1964 disestablishments in Norway